Kattamuru is a major panchayath village in Peddapuram Mandal of East Godavari District of Andhra Pradesh in South India.

Geography

Kattamuru is located at 17.08° N 82.13° E. It has an average elevation of 35 metres (114 feet).

Demographics 

Population Data of Kattamuru Village as per 2001 Census:

References 

 East Godavari District Pincode Number
 Population details of Kattamuru
 2001 census of Kattamuru/madireddy rambabu

Villages in East Godavari district